National Express Midland Metro operated the Midland Metro tram system between Birmingham and Wolverhampton in England from May 1999 until June 2018. It was a subsidiary of National Express, who also owned the local bus company National Express West Midlands. The National Express Midland Metro brand name and logo were not carried on trams and on most publicity, just 'The Metro' branding with the exception of printed timetables.

History
The Midland Metro was built and operated by the Altram consortium owned by Ansaldo, John Laing and National Express opening on 30 May 2005. In March 2006 National Express bought out its consortium partners. Midland Metro was specified and financed by the West Midlands Passenger Transport Executive. The operating company was previously named Travel Midland Metro in keeping with National Express' previous naming structure for subsidiary companies.

National Express operated the concession until 23 June 2018, when it was taken over by Transport for West Midlands.

Fleet
The original fleet consisted of 16 AnsaldoBreda T-69 trams. These were replaced by 21 CAF Urbos 3s in 2014/15. Originally trams were intended to carry an off-white with yellow, blue and green stripes livery, but instead carried a purple, yellow, red, green and grey livery. This was replaced by a pink and silver livery in 2007.

References

External links

Midland Metro Official site
Network West Midlands Metro Page

West Midlands Metro
National Express companies
Transport companies established in 1999
Transport companies disestablished in 2018
Transport in Birmingham, West Midlands
Transport in Wolverhampton
1999 establishments in England
2018 disestablishments in England